The Ministry of Consumer Affairs may refer to:

Ministry of Consumer Affairs, Food and Public Distribution (India)
Ministry of Domestic Trade and Consumer Affairs (Malaysia)
Ministry of Consumer Affairs (New Zealand)
Ministry of Consumer Affairs (Spain)